Oxford High School is a private day school for girls in Oxford, England. It was founded by the Girls' Day School Trust in 1875, making it the city's oldest girls' school.

History

Oxford High School was opened on 3 November 1875, with twenty-nine girls and three teachers under headmistress Ada Benson, at the Judge's Lodgings (St Giles' House) at 16 St Giles', central Oxford. It was the 9th school opened by the Girls' Public Day School Company. Pupils were given a holiday when the Assize Judge visited. The school moved to 38 St Giles' in 1879 and then to 21 Banbury Road at the start of 1881, in a building designed by Sir Thomas Graham Jackson, just south of the location of another Jackson building, the Acland Nursing Home. By this time, the headmistress was Matilda Ellen Bishop.

Rapid expansion led to the ultimate removal of the school to Belbroughton Road in 1957. It became a direct grant grammar school in 1945 under the Education Act 1944 and chose to become independent in 1976 after the scheme was abolished. The junior section was opened in 1989 and further expanded in the 1990s to meet the growing demand. It absorbed two preparatory schools, Greycotes and The Squirrel, which meant girls could now be educated at Oxford High School from age 3 to Sixth Form.

Academics
Oxford High School regularly ranks as one of the country's highest achieving independent schools in terms of examination results. The school was ranked first in the South East in a Sunday Times survey based on exam results and "value for money". In the 2011 examinations it was ranked amongst the top 20 independent schools nationwide for GCSE results and the best performing girls' school in the A Levels.

In 2006, the school became the first in Oxfordshire to make Mandarin a compulsory subject. Pupils will study it for at least a year accompanying French and can choose to either continue Mandarin or continue French.

Houses
The girls in the senior school are divided into four houses, each named after an Ancient Greek deity:

Zeus (green)
Ares (blue)
Athena (yellow)
Poseidon (red)

Headteachers
Ada Benson 1875–1879
Matilda Ellen Bishop 1879–1887
Lucy Helen Soulsby 1887–1897
Edith Marion Leahy 1898–1902
Rosalind Mabel Brown 1902–1932
Margaret Gale 1932–1936
Violet Evelyn Stack 1937–1959 
M.E. Ann Hancock 1959–1966 
Mary Warnock 1966–1972
Elaine Kaye 1972–1981
Joan Townsend 1981–1996
Felicity Lusk 1997–2010
Judith Carlisle 2011–2016
Philip Hills 2017–2019

Notable former pupils

 Josephine Barnes (1912–1999), first woman President British Medical Association (BMA)
 Ursula Bethell (1874–1945), New Zealand poet and social worker
 Emma Bridgewater, potter
 Jacintha Buddicom, poet and childhood friend of George Orwell
 Nancy Cadogan, artist
 Catherine Conybeare, academic and philologist
 Charithra Chandran, actress
 Dame Cressida Dick (b. 1960), former Commissioner of the Metropolitan Police
 Sian Edwards, conductor
 Martha Lane Fox, entrepreneur lastminute.com
 Mel Giedroyc, actress/comedian
 Lucy Gordon, actress/model
 Emily Gowers, Professor of Latin literature at the University of Cambridge
 Sophie Grigson, cookery TV/writer
 Ethel Hatch, British painter
 Dame Margaret Hodge, Labour MP and minister
 Florence Pugh, actress
 Verena Winifred Holmes, engineer
 Harriet Hunt, chess International Master
 Elizabeth Irving, actress and founder of the Keep Britain Tidy Campaign
 Elizabeth Jennings (1926–2001), poet
 Ludmilla Jordanova, Professor of Modern History at the King's College London
 Frances Kirwan  mathematician
 Susan Lea  Professor at the University of Oxford
 Anna Lapwood, Director of Music at Pembroke College, Cambridge and television/radio presenter
 Dame Rose Macaulay, novelist
 Serena Mackesy, journalist and author
 Miriam Margolyes, (b. 1941), actress
 Ghislaine Maxwell, (junior section, left age 9), socialite and convicted child sex trafficker
 Charlotte Mendelson (b. 1972), novelist
 Anne Mills , health economist
 Teresa Morgan, academic
 Eleanor Oldroyd, BBC Radio Sport presenter
 Ann Pasternak Slater, academic
 Eileen Power (1889–1940), economic historian and medievalist
 Rhoda Power (1890–1957), broadcaster and children's writer
 Liz Shore, former deputy chief medical officer
 Dame Maggie Smith, double Oscar-winning actress, seven times BAFTA Film Awards winner, Triple Crown of Acting
 Barbara Strachey (1912–1999), broadcaster and writer
 Catherine Tucker, American economist
 Ayesha Vardag, Founder & President of Vardags, divorce lawyer
 Anna Walker, British civil servant

References

External links

 School Website
 Headmistress's letters on the school website.
 Profile on the ISC website

Girls' schools in Oxfordshire
Educational institutions established in 1875
Schools in Oxford
Private schools in Oxfordshire
Schools of the Girls' Day School Trust
1875 establishments in England
Member schools of the Girls' Schools Association